Scenema Concept International is a Filipino film studio best known for its historical action films starring politician E.R. Ejercito. Existing since the early 2000s and based in Pasig, Metro Manila, Scenema began as a company which provided facilities and digital equipment to filmmakers and other clients.

In 2011, Scenema began producing feature films in partnership with Viva Films with its Metro Manila Film Festival (MMFF) entry Manila Kingpin: The Asiong Salonga Story, which won 11 of the festival's awards including Best Picture. The company's second feature film, El Presidente, was also submitted the next year as an entry to the MMFF, where it won 8 awards including Second Best Picture. Its last MMFF entry, Muslim Magnum .357, is a remake of a Fernando Poe Jr. film and was released in 2014.

Scenema has encountered controversy over the years. Tikoy Aguiluz, the director of Manila Kingpin, had his name removed from the film due to producers reediting the film without his permission. A planned feature film based on the Mamasapano clash in January 2015 was announced in February by actor E.R. Ejercito, though it entered development hell after receiving criticism for its potential to give a disrespectful treatment of the event. By 2021, Scenema is no longer involved with the film as a production company.

Feature films

References

2000s establishments in the Philippines
Entertainment companies established in the 2000s
Film production companies of the Philippines
Mass media companies established in the 2000s
Philippine film studios